Rhynocoris ventralis is a species of assassin bug in the family Reduviidae. It is found in North America.

Subspecies
These four subspecies belong to the species Rhynocoris ventralis:
 Rhynocoris ventralis americanus Bergroth, 1897
 Rhynocoris ventralis annulipes Van Duzee, 1914
 Rhynocoris ventralis femoralis Van Duzee, 1914
 Rhynocoris ventralis ventralis Say, 1832

References

Further reading

External links

 

Reduviidae
Hemiptera of North America
Insects described in 1832
Taxa named by Thomas Say
Articles created by Qbugbot